Claire Boudreau,  (1965 – November 17, 2020) was a Canadian historian, genealogist, and officer of arms. She served as a herald in the Canadian Heraldic Authority from March 17, 1997 in the office of Saguenay Herald and later as Saint-Laurent Herald, to which office she succeeded on the retirement of Auguste Vachon, and then Deputy Chief Herald from December 1, 2005 until June 16, 2007, when she was made the second Chief Herald of Canada following the retirement of Robert Watt.  She was also a nationally and internationally recognized scholar in heraldic studies. She was the author of many articles and publications. She was the principal designer and administrator of the authority's pioneering online Public Register of Arms, Flags and Badges of Canada, which was unveiled in July 2005. She was made an Academician of the Académie Internationale d'Héraldique in 2000. On May 20, 2020, Boudreau was appointed Margaree-Chéticamp herald emeritus and succeeded as Chief Herald of Canada by Samy Khalid.

On November 18, 2020, it was announced that she died due to cancer at the age of 55.

Arms

Publications
L'héritage Symbolique des Hérauts d'Armes: Dictionnaire Encyclopédique de l'Enseignement du Blason Ancien (XIVe-XVIe siècle) (Le Léopard d'or, Paris, 2006).

See also
Royal Heraldry Society of Canada

References

External links
Coat of arms of Claire Boudreau

1965 births
2020 deaths
Genealogists
Canadian officers of arms
Canadian Heraldic Authority
Chief Heralds of Canada
Fellows of the Royal Heraldry Society of Canada